The 1971 Dunedin mayoral election was part of the New Zealand local elections held that same year. In 1971, elections were held for the Mayor of Dunedin plus other local government positions including twelve city councillors. The polling was conducted using the standard first-past-the-post electoral method.

Jim Barnes, the incumbent Mayor was re-elected for a second term. He defeated former mayor Russell Calvert who had been re-elected to the council in a mid-term by-election. The state of parties remained unchanged on the city council with the Citizens' Association winning eight seats and the Labour Party four.

Results
The following table shows the results for the election:

References

Mayoral elections in Dunedin
Dunedin
Politics of Dunedin
1970s in Dunedin
October 1971 events in New Zealand